The 1987 Penn State Nittany Lions football team represented Penn State University during the 1987 NCAA Division I-A football season.

Schedule

Game summaries

Notre Dame

    
    
    
    
    
    

Blair Thomas 35 Rush, 214 Yds

Roster

NFL Draft
Four Nittany Lions were drafted in the 1988 NFL Draft.

References

Penn State
Penn State Nittany Lions football seasons
Penn State Nittany Lions football